Gabersee is a borough of the town Wasserburg am Inn in Bavaria in Germany. Gabersee was the site of a post World War II American sector displaced person camp. It is the birthplace of Carl Troll, and home to a psychiatric hospital, where Friedrich Ludwig died.

Geography of Bavaria

de:Wasserburg am Inn